Titoki is a locality in the Mangakahia Valley of the Northland Region of New Zealand's North Island. Whangarei is 26 km (16 miles) to the east. The Wairua River passes to the east of Titoki, and the Mangakahia River to the west.  A hydroelectric plant has been operating at Wairua Falls since 1916. It was upgraded to produce 5.4 Gwh per year in 2007.

The local Korokota Marae is a tribal meeting ground of the Ngāpuhi  of Te Parawhau and the Ngāti Whātua  of Te Parawhau. It features the Tikitiki o Rangi meeting house.

Mangakahia Area School is a coeducational composite school (years 1–15), with a decile rating of 3 and a roll of 157. The school, previously called Titoki District High School, celebrated its centennial in 2007.

Titoki and the Mangakahia River area were important locations for the late 19th/early 20th century kauri gum digging trade.

Notable people
Tania Roxborogh, writer

Notes

External links
 Mangakahia Area School website

Whangarei District
Populated places in the Northland Region